BWPS may refer to 
Brian Wilson Presents Smile, 2004 album
Blind Worms Pious Swine, 2016 album